Waria may refer to -
 Waria River
 Waria, India, a locality in West Bengal
 IK Waria, a Swedish football club
 Waria (person) A portmanteau word for the third gender group in Indonesia
 Waria Rural LLG in Papua New Guinea